Kyle Allen Friend (born April 3, 1994) is a former American football center. He played college football at Temple and signed with the New York Jets as an undrafted free agent in 2016.

Early years
Friend attended Cumberland Valley High School where he was selected to the 2010 and 2011 Associated Press All-State first-team and 2011 Harrisburg Patriot-News All-Area first-team. He was named to the 2011 Harrisburg Patriot-News All-Area first-team and 2011 Mid-Penn All-Conference. He was named Defensive Player of the Year and helped Cumberland Valley High School football team win back-to-back district championships in 2009 and 2010.

Professional career
Coming out of Temple, Friend was projected by the majority of NFL draft experts and scouts to be selected in the seventh round or be signed as a priority undrafted free agent.

New York Jets
On April 30, 2016, Friend signed with the New York Jets as an undrafted free agent following the conclusion of the 2016 NFL Draft. On August 28, 2016, he was waived by the Jets. He was re-signed to the practice squad on October 26, 2016. He was released by the Jets on November 1, 2016, but was re-signed on December 20, 2016.

Pittsburgh Steelers
On February 14, 2017, Friend was signed by the Pittsburgh Steelers. He was waived on September 2, 2017 and was signed to the Steelers' practice squad the next day.

Carolina Panthers
On May 14, 2018, Friend signed with the Carolina Panthers. He was waived on September 1, 2018.

Arizona Cardinals
On October 17, 2018, Friend was signed to the Arizona Cardinals practice squad. He was released on October 26, 2018, but was re-signed four days later. He was released on November 7, 2018.

Cleveland Browns
On December 18, 2018, Friend was signed to the Cleveland Browns practice squad. The Browns signed Friend to a futures contract on January 2, 2019.

Friend was waived by the Browns on April 29, 2019.

References

External links
Temple Owls bio

1994 births
Living people
American football centers
Arizona Cardinals players
Carolina Panthers players
Cleveland Browns players
New York Jets players
People from Carlisle, Pennsylvania
Pittsburgh Steelers players
Players of American football from Pennsylvania
Temple Owls football players